The single mixed relay biathlon competition at the 2020 Winter Youth Olympics was held on 12 January at the Les Tuffes Nordic Centre.

Results
The race was started at 10:30.

References

Single mixed relay